Eau Sauvage is a perfume for men that is produced by Parfums Christian Dior and was created by perfumer Edmond Roudnitska. The perfume was introduced in 1966, and it was Dior's first perfume for men. 

The name of the fragrance is reputedly the result of a late arrival by Christian Dior's friend Percy Savage to Dior's home. Dior had asked Savage to help find a name for a perfume for men. When Savage arrived, he was announced by Dior's butler as "Monsieur Sauvage"; the designer decided that "Oh, Sauvage" would be a fitting name.

On its release, advertisements for the perfume featured French actor Alain Delon.

References

Dior
Perfumes
Products introduced in 1966